Primavera is a city located in the state of Pernambuco, Brazil. Located  at 81.6 km away from Recife, capital of the state of Pernambuco. Has an estimated (IBGE 2020) population of 15,101 inhabitants. Its name means spring in portuguese.

Geography
 State – Pernambuco
 Region – Zona da mata Pernambucana
 Boundaries – Pombos and Chã Grande (N); Ribeirão (S);  Escada  and Vitória de Santo Antão   (E);  Amaraji   (W)
 Area – 109.94 km2
 Elevation – 129 m
 Hydrography – Sirinhaém and Ipojuca rivers
 Vegetation – Subcaducifólia forest
 Climate – Hot tropical and humid
 Annual average temperature – 24.7°C
 Distance to Recife – 81.6 km

Economy
The main economic activities in Primavera are largely dominated by the food & beverage  industry (81%) and agribusiness, especially sugarcane, passion fruits and cattle.

Economic indicators

Economy by Sector
2006

Health indicators

References

Municipalities in Pernambuco